Mars Needs Moms is a 2011 American 3D computer-animated science fiction film co-written and directed by Simon Wells, produced by ImageMovers Digital and released by Walt Disney Pictures. Based on the Berkeley Breathed book of the same title, it tells the story of a nine-year-old boy named Milo who sets out to save his mother after she is taken away by Martians. The film was animated through the process of performance capture and stars Seth Green, Dan Fogler, Elisabeth Harnois, Mindy Sterling, and Joan Cusack. It was the second and final film produced by ImageMovers Digital before the studio was shut down and re-absorbed into ImageMovers.

Mars Needs Moms was released in theaters on March 11, 2011, in Disney Digital 3D, RealD 3D and IMAX 3D formats. The film received mixed-to-negative reviews from critics, who praised the visuals, voice acting, score, and set design, but criticized its story, drama, and characters. Opinions of the motion capture animation were mixed. Some praised it for looking realistic and others criticized it for falling into the uncanny valley and looking creepy. It grossed $39.2 million worldwide on a $150 million budget, becoming a box-office bomb.

Plot

Unbeknownst to humans, there is a thriving, technologically sophisticated society of Martians living below the surface of Mars. The Martians' Supervisor, while observing Earth, sees a mother persuading her son, Milo, to do his chores. The Martians decide to bring her to Mars, where her "mom-ness" will be extracted and implanted into the next-generation of nanny-bots. Meanwhile, Milo, who doesn't like to follow house rules and do chores and has been sent to his room for feeding broccoli to his cat, Cujo, sarcastically tells his mother that his life would be better without her, which hurts her deeply.

Later that night, Milo goes to apologize, but discovers his mom is taken away. He runs after her, but they end up in separate parts of the Martian spaceship. On Mars, Milo is taken to an underground prison cell. He escapes and is chased by the Supervisor's henchmen, but he follows a voice that tells him to jump down a chute, and lands in a lower subterranean level. There, he sees a trash-covered landscape that is inhabited by furry creatures.

Milo is whisked away by the creatures to meet Gribble, also known as George Ribble, the childlike adult human who had told him to jump down the chute. Gribble explains to Milo that the Martians plan to extract Milo's mom's memories at sunrise, using a process that will kill her. Gribble, who is lonely and does not want Milo to leave, pretends to help Milo find his mother. His plan goes awry, leading to Gribble being captured and Milo being chased by the Supervisor's henchmen. Milo is rescued by Ki, one of the supervisors who raise Martian babies. Milo tells her about his search for his Mom and what a human relationship with a mom is like, as Ki and her kin were mentored by only nanny-bots and supervisors and do not know of love.

Milo returns to Gribble's home but finds him missing. Gribble's robotic spider, Two-Cat, takes Milo to the Martian compound where Gribble is being prepared for execution. Milo is captured by his henchmen, but Ki tosses him a laser gun, allowing him to escape. Milo and Gribble retreat to an even lower uninhabited level, where Gribble describes his own mom's abduction and murder by the Martians 20 years ago. Gribble blames himself for her being chosen and regrets that he had not been able to save her. Milo convinces Gribble to actually help him just as Ki finds them. They discover an ancient mural of a Martian family and realize that Martian children were not always raised by machines. Gribble explains that Martian female babies are currently raised by nanny-bots in the technologically advanced society, while the male babies are sent down below to be raised by adult male Martians, which are the furry creatures he encountered earlier.

Milo, Gribble, and Ki save Milo's mom just before sunrise, causing the energy of the extraction device to short out the electronic locks to the control room. This lets the adult males and babies enter, where they run amok, attacking the guards and robots. Milo and his mom steal oxygen helmets and try to escape across the Martian surface, but the Supervisor, while attempting to kill them, causes Milo to trip and his helmet shatters. His mom gives him her own helmet, saving Milo but causing herself to suffocate in the planet's air. The Martians are awed, as this is the first time they have seen love. Gribble finds his own mother's helmet and gives it to Milo's mom, saving her. Milo apologizes to his mom for his earlier words and the two reconcile. Ki brings a ship for them to escape in, but the Supervisor intervenes. Ki argues that Martians were meant to be raised in families, with love, but the Supervisor insists that the current situation is better because, to her, it is more efficient. The henchmen realizes the Supervisor's cruel nature and arrest her, deciding that they now prefer the loving vision of family life, and the other Martians celebrate.

Milo, his mom, Gribble, Ki, and Two-Cat travel back to Earth. Gribble decides not to stay because he wants to pursue a relationship with Ki on Mars. Milo and his mom return home just before Milo's dad arrives.

Cast
 Seth Green as Milo (performance capture), a 9-year-old boy who has a strained relationship with his mother
 Seth Dusky as Milo (voice)
 Dan Fogler as Gribble, a childish human living in Mars that Milo befriends
 Elisabeth Harnois as Ki, an English language knowing martian who defects from the Supervisor and teams up with Milo and Gribble
 Mindy Sterling as The Supervisor, the owner and the ruler of the Martians who seek to capture children's moms and extract their momness to nannybots
 Joan Cusack as Milo's mom
 Kevin Cahoon as Wingnut, a male martian and one of Gribble's friends
 Dee Bradley Baker as Two-Cat (voice), Gribble's bug-like robot assistant
 Tom Everett Scott as Milo's dad
 Raymond, Robert, and Ryan Ochoa as Martian Hatchlings
 Matthew Henerson, Adam Jennings, Stephen Kearin, Amber Gainey Meade, Aaron Rapke, Julene Renee, Kirsten Severson, and Matthew Wolf as Martians

Production
Simon Wells had known Robert Zemeckis since the mid-1980s, having worked on Who Framed Roger Rabbit (1988), Back to the Future Part II (1989), Back to the Future Part III (1990), and The Polar Express (2004). The production designer was Doug Chiang, and the supervising art director was Norm Newberry. The title of the film (and to an extent, the source material) is a twist on the title of American International Pictures' 1966 film Mars Needs Women.

The makers came up with their own alien language. In developing the language, all of the actors 
spent a day where they recorded different interpretations of a list of words; the producers picked their favorite interpretations from that recording and put them in a book documenting the fictional language for the actors to speak.

Elisabeth Harnois stated in an interview that she and the cast were given scenarios by Wells to which they acted out responses in improvised Martian language.

Seth Green described doing the motion-capture as physically demanding work: "A lot of running, jumping, falling, hitting, spinning. I wore a harness for, like, 85 percent of the movie. It was uncomfortable." After spending six weeks outfitted in a special sensor-equipped performance capture suit while simultaneously performing Milo's lines, Seth Green's voice sounded too mature for the character and was dubbed over by that of 12-year-old newcomer Seth R. Dusky.

For the auditions, Kevin Cahoon performed two scenes, including the ending; he recalled the instructions saying, "create your Martian language and play the scene." He previously played Ed, another non-speaking role, in the Broadway musical version of The Lion King (1994): "it's almost like silent film. You have to speak with your heart and soul and face, and you have to act as if you have dialogue with everyone else. I think that's where you find the humanity, or the martiananity, of the character." Cahoon's mannerisms were also used for the other martians. Mars Needs Moms is Cahoon's first time collaborating with Dan Fogler since the two worked with each other in New York stage theater. As he described his opinion on the film, "I was blown away. It's beautiful. The technology is incredible and the IMAX is awesome. I was so impressed with the score, but also the heart. I got misty-eyes towards the end with the mom/Milo relationship. I thought it really connected in a wonderful way and am so honored to be a part of it."

In 2020, Brie Larson revealed via YouTube that she had auditioned for the character Ki, who was eventually portrayed by Elisabeth Harnois.

Release
Mars Needs Moms was released in theaters on March 11, 2011. The film's premiere was held at the El Capitan Theatre in Los Angeles on March 6, 2011.

Home media
The film was released on Blu-ray, Blu-ray 3D, DVD, and movie download on August 9, 2011. The release is produced in three different physical packages: a four-disc combo pack (Blu-ray, Blu-ray 3D, DVD, and "Digital Copy"); a two-disc Blu-ray combo pack (Blu-ray and DVD); and a single-disc DVD.  The "Digital Copy" included with the four-disc combo pack is a separate disc that allows users to download a copy of the film onto a computer through iTunes or Windows Media Player software.  The film is also a movie download or On-Demand option.  All versions of the release (except for the On-Demand option) include the "Fun with Seth" and "Martian 101" bonus features, while the Blu-ray 2D version additionally includes deleted scenes, the "Life On Mars: The Full Motion-Capture Experience" feature, and an extended opening film clip.  The Blu-ray 3D version also has an alternate scene called "Mom-Napping", a finished 3D alternate scene of the Martian abduction of Milo's mom.

Reception

Box office 
Mars Needs Moms was a box-office disaster, and the worst financial loss for a Disney-branded film. It grossed $1,725,000 on its first day, and its opening weekend earnings added up to $6,825,000. Overall, the film debuted in fifth place behind Battle: Los Angeles, Rango, Red Riding Hood and The Adjustment Bureau. This is the 22nd-worst opening ever for a film playing in 3,000+ theaters. Adjusted for inflation, considering the total net loss of money (not the profit-to-loss ratio), it is the fourth-largest box office failure in history. In 2014, the Los Angeles Times listed the film as one of the most expensive box-office disasters of all time. On March 14, 2011, Brooks Barnes of The New York Times commented that it was rare for a Disney-branded film to do so badly, with the reason for its poor performance being the unoriginal premise, the animation style which failed to cross the uncanny valley threshold, and negative word of mouth on social networks, along with releasing it on the same week as Battle: Los Angeles which had more hype with the general movie goers. Barnes concluded, "Critics and audiences alike, with audiences voicing their opinions on Twitter, blogs and other social media, complained that the Zemeckis technique can result in character facial expressions that look unnatural. Another common criticism was that Mr. Zemeckis focuses so much on technological wizardry that he neglects storytelling."

Critical response 
The review aggregator website Rotten Tomatoes reported a 37% approval rating with an average rating of 5.00/10 based on 116 reviews. The website's consensus reads, "The cast is solid and it's visually well-crafted, but Mars Needs Moms suffers from a lack of imagination and heart." On Metacritic, the film had a score of 49 out of 100 based on 22 critics, indicating "mixed or average reviews". Audiences polled by CinemaScore gave the film an average grade of "B" on an A+ to F scale.

The Sydney Morning Herald labeled the motion-capture animation superior to Avatar (2009), and while noting the story had "pure Disney cheese", Wells "thankfully know[s] precisely when to inject action and humour when the mush-o-meter approaches the red."

Some critics favorably compared the set design to Tron: Legacy (2010), including Tim Grierson of Screen Daily, who opined that the motion-capture "improved significantly since the days of The Polar Express." He also spotlighted the film's attempt at a "tonal divide", as it has both comic sequences typical for a kids film and themes about sacrifice. However, he criticized the "chaotic" story and two "irksome" protagonists: Milo, whose voice actor "overdoes the character's whiny anxiousness to the point that it's hard to root for him;" and Gribble, a "predictably wisecracking sidekick". Us Weekly also panned the characters: "[Milo] makes a whiny hero, and Dan Fogler (as his buddy on Mars) fails to amuse. Plus, why is Milo's stay-at-home mom a saint and the working alien moms evil?"

The Hollywood Reporter praised Mars Needs Moms's motion-capture visuals, but analogized its story as too much like a Disneyland ride and also called it "odd [...] how a movie meant to glorify moms is so riddled with anti-feminist concepts." Time Out New York called it not that much different from other children's science fiction movies: "After the novelty of these backgrounds and comin’-at-ya bits wears off, Mars Needs Moms has to rely on Fogler's obnoxious Jack Black Jr. shtick, a weak subplot involving a ’60s-obsessed Martian graffiti artist (Harnois) and rote video-game-y action sequences to carry it along—and that simply won't cut it."

Entertainment Weekly positively described the film as a children's movie version of Avatar: "Enhanced by nimble ad-libbing from the comedy-trained cast, the screenplay is delightful, by turns funny and emotional, as befits a Disney family fable in which, through wacky adversity, Mom and kid reaffirm their love for each other while Dad is nowhere in sight. (He's not dead, just away on business.) And with its splendid use of computer-generated motion-capture animation and 3-D effects, the movie is also visually magnificent — modestly so." Mike Hale of the New York Times also gave the film a negative review, saying, "Mars, once again, looks to Earth to supplement its female population because, it seems, the women who run Mars think Earth mothers are skilled at child rearing."

Lael Loewenstein of Variety magazine gave the film a mixed review and called it "A modestly enjoyable performance-capture creation bearing the unmistakable imprint of producer Robert Zemeckis." In addition to acclaiming the visuals, 
SFX also opined gave some praises towards the writing "there are some good laughs, it's pacy enough to whizz us on by the sometimes repetitive narrative [...] and although it's hard to see little boys admitting that they really do love their mummies – as much as the film wants them to – Mars Needs Moms does provoke a few lumps in older throats, for all you may decry its mawkish Stateside sensibilities."

Nick Schager of The Village Voice was very harsh; panning the "rubbery", "unreal", and "unsettling" character animation, which he called a "jarring dissonance" with the science fiction setting; and the stealing of common tropes in other well-known science fiction films. He also noted a major plot hole, specifically Supervisor's stealing of mothers' disciplinary skills for use on technological devices: "The plot thus hinges on a fundamental illogicality, since the chief differentiating characteristic between mothers and machines isn't discipline but compassion." William Thomas of Empire Magazine gave the film a two out of five stars, saying, "An uninvolving mo-cap adventure that's well below par. Marvin the Martian would be unhappy to share his planet with this bunch."

Some reviewers questioned the film's moral about well-behaved kids having their very good mothers taken by aliens.

Accolades 
Mars Needs Moms received a nomination for a Movieguide Award for Best Film for Family Audiences; while John Powell's work on it, Rio (2011), and Kung Fu Panda 2 (2011) garnered him a nomination for the 2011 World Soundtrack Award for Film Composer of the Year.

See also
 List of biggest box-office bombs
 List of films set on Mars
 List of films featuring extraterrestrials
 Mars in fiction

References

External links

 
 
 
 Mars Needs Moms at the Big Cartoon Database
 
 
 
 Pictures of the scoring sessions of Mars Needs Moms at Scoringsessions.com

2011 films
2011 3D films
2011 comedy films
2011 fantasy films
2011 science fiction films
2011 computer-animated films
2010s American animated films
2010s children's adventure films
2010s children's comedy films
2010s children's fantasy films
2010s children's animated films
2010s adventure comedy films
2010s fantasy comedy films
2010s science fiction comedy films
2010s English-language films
American 3D films
American computer-animated films
American children's animated comic science fiction films
American children's animated science fantasy films
American children's animated space adventure films
American adventure comedy films
American fantasy comedy films
American science fiction comedy films
American robot films
American films with live action and animation
3D animated films
Animated films based on American novels
Animated films based on children's books
Films based on science fiction novels
Adaptations of works by Berkeley Breathed
Animated films about children
Films about mother–son relationships
Matriarchy
Fictional Martians
Alien abduction films
Alien invasions in films
Animated films about robots
Animated films about extraterrestrial life
Mars in film
Animated films set in the future
Films set in 2011
Films using motion capture
Films directed by Simon Wells
Films produced by Robert Zemeckis
Films scored by John Powell
Walt Disney Pictures films
Walt Disney Pictures animated films
ImageMovers films
IMAX films